Loucif Hamani (15 May 1950 – 9 November 2021) was an Algerian boxer who competed at the 1972 Summer Olympic Games in the light-middleweight event where he reached the quarter finals before losing to Alan Minter of Great Britain. Earlier, Hamani defeated José Antonio Colon of Puerto Rico in his first bout and Anthony Richardson of the Netherlands in his second. Hamani was born in Igoufaf, Tizi Ouzou Province.

He later turned professional winning 24 of his 27 fights and was African Boxing Union super welterweight champion. One of his three professional losses was a second-round knockout against Marvin Hagler on 16 February 1980 in Portland, Maine.

References

1950 births
2021 deaths
Boxers at the 1972 Summer Olympics
Olympic boxers of Algeria
Algerian male boxers
Light-middleweight boxers
Middleweight boxers
People from Tizi Ouzou Province
African Games gold medalists for Algeria
African Games medalists in boxing
Boxers at the 1973 All-Africa Games
African Boxing Union champions
21st-century Algerian people
20th-century Algerian people